Bethlehem Village is a census-designated place (CDP) within the town of Bethlehem in Litchfield County, Connecticut, United States. The CDP includes the Bethlehem Green Historic District at the town center, as well as surrounding residential and rural land. As of the 2010 census, the CDP had a population of 2,021, out of a population of 3,607 for the entire town of Bethlehem.

Geography
The Bethlehem Village CDP occupies about 40% of the town of Bethlehem, covering the center part of the town from its border with Morris in the north to Crane Hollow Road, Robert Leather Road, and Porter Hill Road in the south. The CDP extends east to Hard Hill Road N, East Spring Brook, and Nonnewaug Road, and west to Weekeepeemee Road, Judge Lane, Woodcreek Road, and Munger Lane.

Long Meadow Pond and the Bronson E. Lockwood Reservoir are in the northern part of the CDP.

Connecticut Route 61 passes through the center of the village, leading north  to Litchfield and south  to U.S. Route 6 in Woodbury. Connecticut Route 132 crosses Route 61 at the village center, leading east four miles to Connecticut Route 63 in Watertown and southwest  to Connecticut Route 47 in Woodbury.

Demographics
At the 2010 census, there were 2,021 people, 840 households and 573 families residing in the CDP. There were 969 housing units, of which 129, or 13.3%, were vacant. 95 of the vacant units were for seasonal or recreational use. The racial makeup of the CDP was 97.9% White, 0.4% African American, 0.2% Native American, 0.3% Asian, 0.2% some other race and 0.9% from two or more races. Hispanic or Latino of any race were 1.5% of the population.

Of the 840 households in the CDP, 26.4% had children under the age of 18 living with them, 57.0% were headed by married couples living together, 7.9% had a female householder with no husband present, and 31.8% were non-families. 26.4% of all households were made up of individuals, and 12.3% were someone living alone who was 65 years of age or older. The average household size was 2.37, and the average family size was 2.88.

19.3% of the population were under the age of 18, 2.9% were from 18 to 24, 19.4% were from 25 to 44, 38.4% were from 45 to 64, and 15.0% were 65 years of age or older. The median age was 47.0 years. For every 100 females, there were 99.9 males. For every 100 females age 18 and over, there were 98.4 males.

For the period 2013-17, the estimated median household income was $90,125 and the median family income was $110,781. Male full-time workers had a median income of $54,063 compared with $66,000 for females. The per capita income for the CDP was $47,614. 1.4% of families and 6.0% of the total population were living below the poverty line, including 5.6% of people under eighteen and 9.2% of those over 64.

References

Bethlehem, Connecticut
Census-designated places in Litchfield County, Connecticut